Jessica Wetterling (born 1 December 1986) is a Swedish politician from the Left Party, who has been a member of the Riksdag from Västra Götaland County West since 2018.

She was also elected as Member of the Riksdag in September 2022.

References

See also 
 List of members of the Riksdag, 2018–2022

Living people
1986 births
Members of the Riksdag from the Left Party (Sweden)
21st-century Swedish politicians
21st-century Swedish women politicians
Women members of the Riksdag
Members of the Riksdag 2018–2022
Members of the Riksdag 2022–2026